Dehere (April 13, 1991 - c. May 16, 2014) was an American Champion Thoroughbred racehorse. He was bred and raced by Robert E. Brennan's Due Process Stable. Sired by  Canadian Hall of Fame inductee and two-time North American Champion sire, Deputy Minister, he was out of the mare Sister Dot, a daughter of the U.S. Triple Crown champion Secretariat.

Racing at age two in 1993, Dehere joined Regret (1914), Campfire (1916), and City Zip (2000) as the only horses to ever win all three Saratoga Race Course events for two-year-olds: the Saratoga Special Stakes, Sanford Stakes and Hopeful Stakes. Dehere's other major victory in 1993 came in the Grade I Champagne Stakes. He went into the Breeders' Cup Juvenile having won five of his six starts. In his only loss, he had finished second to Holy Bull in the Belmont Futurity Stakes. Breeders' Cup bettors made him a prohibitive favorite, bet down to odds of 7-10. In the race, at the three-quarter pole Dehere moved into third place but then faded and finished eighth to winner Brocco. Despite the loss, Dehere's 1993 performances earned him the Eclipse Award for Outstanding 2-Year-Old Male Horse.

Dehere raced only twice as a three-year-old, winning the Fountain of Youth Stakes. A fracture of his right hind cannon bone during training ended his racing career. Acquired by Ireland's Coolmore Stud, he was retired to breeding duty at their Ashford Stud in Versailles, Kentucky. During his five years there, he was shuttled to Coolmore breeding operations in Australia before being sold in 1999 to the Japan Bloodhorse Breeders' Association's Iburi Stallion Station in Hokkaidō, Japan. In 2005, Coolmore reacquired Dehere and he is again shuttling between Ashford Stud and Coolmore Australia.

Notable progeny 

c = colt, f = filly, g = gelding

References

 Dehere's pedigree and partial racing stats
 Dehere at the Bloodhorse.com stallion directory
 Dehere's Profile on Coolmore.com

1991 racehorse births
2014 racehorse deaths
Racehorses bred in Kentucky
Racehorses trained in the United States
Eclipse Award winners
Thoroughbred family 2-o
Chefs-de-Race